Katherine Reynolds Lewis is an American journalist and author.

Life 
Lewis attended Phillips Exeter Academy and graduated from Harvard University with a bachelor's degree in physics. She worked as national correspondent for Newhouse News Service and as a national reporter for Bloomberg News and contributes to Fortune magazine, USA Today's magazine group, The Washington Post, Working Mother magazine, Time, and The Huffington Post.

Her first book The Good News About Bad Behavior: Why Kids Are Less Disciplined Than Ever -- And What to Do About It was published by PublicAffairs in April 2018.

References

External links 
 

Year of birth missing (living people)
Living people
Harvard University alumni
American women journalists
Bloomberg L.P. people
Phillips Exeter Academy alumni
21st-century American women